Linda Schofield (born May 13, 1955) is an American politician who served in the Connecticut House of Representatives from the 16th district from 2007 to 2013.

References

1955 births
Living people
Democratic Party members of the Connecticut House of Representatives